Byron James (born 31 August 1967) is a Guyanese former cyclist. He competed in the road race at the 1988 Summer Olympics.

References

External links
 

1967 births
Living people
Guyanese male cyclists
Olympic cyclists of Guyana
Cyclists at the 1988 Summer Olympics
Place of birth missing (living people)